Colchicum laetum is a species of Colchicum found in south east Russia through to the Caucasus.

A plant known in cultivation as C. laetum 'Pink Star' is thought to be a selection of Colchicum × byzantinum. It has flowers which are pale purple-pink with rounded ends; the petals of each bloom are often held parallel to the soil surface.

References

laetum
Flora of the Caucasus
Flora of South European Russia